Zanaga Airport  is an airport serving Zanaga, a town in the Lékoumou Department of the Republic of the Congo. The runway is adjacent to the north side of the town.

See also

List of airports in the Republic of the Congo
Transport in the Republic of the Congo

References

External links
OpenStreetMap - Zanaga
OurAirports - Zanaga

Airports in the Republic of the Congo